The Kandyan Monarchy was the last independent monarchy of Sri Lanka, ruled by a succession of monarchs from the Kingdom of Kandy. This monarchy spanned over 230 years from 1590 to 1815 and played a significant role in shaping the country's history and culture. The Kandyan kings enjoyed absolute power, and their rule was marked by complex administrative systems, religious traditions, and cultural practices. This list of Kandyan monarchs provides an overview of the rulers who led the Kingdom of Kandy throughout its existence, from its early formation to its final downfall under British colonial rule.

History of Kandyan Monarchs
The kingdom of Kandy was originally a principality of the kingdom of Kotte, until Senasammata Vikramabahu declared Kandy an independent state in 1469, establishing himself as its first king. However, the kingdom was later conquered by Rajasinghe I of Sitawaka in 1581, marking the end of the first phase of the kingdom under the Siri Sangha Bo dynasty. In 1592, Vimaladharmasuriya I reestablished the kingdom with his Dinaraja dynasty, earning him the title of the Kandyan Kingdom's second founder. During his reign, Kandy became a major political power and the sole successor of Sri Lanka's ancient Anuradhapura, Polonnaruwa, and Kotte kingdoms. The Dinaraja dynasty handed over the kingdom to the Nayakkar Dynasty in 1739 due to a lack of successors, ending the second phase of the kingdom. The Nayakkar Dynasty, which began with Sri Vijaya Rajasinha, was seen as a great religious revival by the people, but the last king of this dynasty, Sri Wickrama Rajasinghe's reign witnessed the gradual decline of the kingdom, leading to the abolition of the king's position in the kingdom in 1815. This resulted in the absorption of the kingdom into the British Empire and marked the end of the Sinhalese Monarchy that had started back in 437 BC.

Authority and Governance of the Kandyan Monarch
The King of Kandy was the supreme ruler of the Kingdom of Kandy. His power was absolute and supreme, and while his ministers could offer advice, they could not control his will. The King held the authority to make peace and war, enact laws and regulations, and enforce the death penalty.

House of Siri Sanga Bo (1473–1592)

House of Dinaraja (1590–1739)

House of Kandy Nayakar (1739–1815)

See also
 Kingdom of Kandy
 List of Sri Lankan monarchs

References

Citations

Bibliography

External links
 Kings & Rulers of Sri Lanka
 Codrington's Short History of Ceylon

Kingdom of Kandy

Sri Lanka history-related lists